Richard Wyatt may refer to:

 Richard James Wyatt (1795–1850), English sculptor
 Richard Wyatt (cricketer), English cricketer
 Richard Wyatt Jr. (born 1955), American muralist 
 Richard Jed Wyatt, American psychiatrist and schizophrenia researcher